This article is a list of Badges and decorations of the Soviet Union. They were awarded primarily for military service, but also for sports, graduation and community participation. The badges were not only given to award service or achievement, but to inspire loyalty and patriotism to the Soviet regime.

"Flag" badges

All-Union Civilian badges

All-Union sport decorations

Military badges

Graduate badges

Badges for Military Excellence

Local badges

Leninist Young Communist League Awards

See also
 Orders, decorations, and medals of the Soviet Union
 Orders, decorations, and medals of the Russian Federation
 Awards and Emblems of the Ministry of Defence of the Russian Federation
 Awards of the Ministry for Emergency Situations of Russia
 Awards of the Ministry of Internal Affairs of Russia
 Awards of the Federal Border Service of the Russian Federation
 Honorary titles of the Russian Federation
 Orders, decorations, and medals of Belarus

References 

Orders, decorations, and medals of the Soviet Union